Port Rhombus EP is a 1996 EP by Squarepusher. It was the first Squarepusher release on Warp Records.  There is also a promo version, with identical tracks, but dated 1994. Also compiled in the US version of Big Loada on Nothing Records.

Track listing
"Port Rhombus" – 6:49
"Problem Child" – 5:43
"Significant Others" – 3:28

References

External links
Port Rhombus EP at the official Warp Records website

Discogs.com entries: CD , vinyl 

1996 EPs
Squarepusher EPs
Warp (record label) EPs

fr:Big Loada